Jaime Peter Romaguera (born 4 July 1966) is a former Australian Paralympic athlete and footballer. He was born in Brisbane and has cerebral palsy. He competed at the 1988 Seoul Paralympics in football 7-a-side and athletics. At the 1992 Atlanta Paralympics, he won a bronze medal in  the Men's 100 m C5 athletics event. He won a silver medal in the Men's 100 m T34 athletics event at the 1996 Atlanta Paralympics.

References

External links
 

1966 births
Living people
Paralympic athletes of Australia
Paralympic 7-a-side soccer players of Australia
Paralympic silver medalists for Australia
Paralympic bronze medalists for Australia
Paralympic medalists in athletics (track and field)
7-a-side footballers at the 1988 Summer Paralympics
Athletes (track and field) at the 1988 Summer Paralympics
Athletes (track and field) at the 1992 Summer Paralympics
Athletes (track and field) at the 1996 Summer Paralympics
Medalists at the 1992 Summer Paralympics
Medalists at the 1996 Summer Paralympics
Athletes from Brisbane
Cyclists with cerebral palsy
Track and field athletes with cerebral palsy
Cerebral Palsy category Paralympic competitors
Australian male sprinters